Tajikistan competed at the 2012 Summer Olympics in London, from 27 July to 12 August 2012. This was the nation's fifth consecutive appearance at the Olympics. The National Olympic Committee of the Republic of Tajikistan sent the nation's largest delegation to the Games. A total of 16 athletes, 13 men and 3 women, competed in 7 sports. Six of these athletes had competed in Beijing, including judoka Rasul Boqiev and freestyle wrestler Yusup Abdusalomov, who both won Tajikistan's first ever Olympic medals.

Tajikistan left London with only a single medal, following its successful Olympics in Beijing. Boxer Mavzuna Chorieva, who won the bronze in women's lightweight division, set a historic Olympic record, as the nation's first female medalist in history, and first female flag bearer at the opening ceremony.

Medalists

Athletics

Tajikistani athletes have so far achieved qualifying standards in the following athletics events (up to a maximum of 3 athletes in each event at the 'A' Standard, and 1 at the 'B' Standard):

Key
 Note – Ranks given for track events are within the athlete's heat only
 Q = Qualified for the next round
 q = Qualified for the next round as a fastest loser or, in field events, by position without achieving the qualifying target
 NR = National record
 N/A = Round not applicable for the event
 Bye = Athlete not required to compete in round

Men

Women

Boxing

Tajikistan has so far qualified boxers for the following events

Men

Women

Judo

Tajikistan has qualified 2 judokas

Shooting

Men

Swimming 

Women

Taekwondo

Tajikistan has qualified the following quota places.

Wrestling

Tajikistan has qualified the following athletes at the wrestling competition.

Key
  - Victory by Fall.
  - Decision by Points - the loser with technical points.
  - Decision by Points - the loser without technical points.

Men's freestyle

References

External links

Nations at the 2012 Summer Olympics
2012
2012 in Tajikistani sport